A  is a small neighborhood police station found in Japan. The term also refers to the smallest organizational unit in a modern Japanese Prefectural police department. Small kōban buildings, staffed by uniformed officers at around 6,000 locations all over the country, are the bases for community policing activities which complement the work of larger, central police stations.

Since the 1990s, many of them have been equipped with signs reading KOBAN in Latin script.

Overview
A kōban is typically a one- or two-story building with a couple of rooms (although there is wide variation), staffed by one to ten (or more) police officers.

They are able to keep a general watch, respond to emergencies, give directions, and otherwise interact with citizens on a more intimate basis than would be the case if they were operating from a more distant station. Although often translated into English as "police box", kōban bear little resemblance to the police boxes formerly found in the UK or the police call boxes formerly found in the US.

History

Soon after, in 1881, kōban were transformed into local community stations with as many as six officers and a new official name  was given to it — although its common name, "kōban" survived.

"Kōban" was further systematized and spread out nationwide, playing an important role in the Japanese police system over decades. In 1994, the official name hashutsujo was changed back to kōban. According to the National Police Agency (NPA), this issue was addressed and solved by 2007.

In 2017, the Tokyo Metropolitan Police Department has been posting officers in kōbans who speak more than one language to help tourists and foreign expats, using the Kabukicho Kōban in Shinjuku and the Shibuya Ekimae Kōban.

In 2019, the NPA has ordered a risk assessment ever since a series of attacks on officers manning the kōbans, who were wounded or killed just to steal their issued items, usually their sidearms. This was in the wake of an attack on a lone officer stationed inside a kōban on June 16, 2019 in Suita (the stolen sidearm was recovered after an arrest in a manhunt). An initial suggestion was to prioritize the issue of special holsters that can easily protect an officer's sidearm from being easily taken.

Other countries

Small police stations similar to the Japanese kōban could most prominently also be found in Singapore, which are known as neighbourhood police centres (NPCs).

Additionally, the kōban system has become popular with international police training and assistance programs, particularly those of the Japan International Cooperation Agency (JICA). JICA has invested money in establishing kōban-style community policing programs in several countries, including Indonesia, Brazil, and Honduras. In 2016, a kōban was built by the Los Angeles Police Department (LAPD) at The Grove Mall in Los Angeles, California, USA; the LAPD also operates a kōban in the Little Tokyo neighborhood.

Services provided

Police officers stationed at kōban serve several roles:
 Maps and directions – providing maps and directions to local addresses, sometimes even personally guiding those unfamiliar with local street layouts and addressing schemes. Additionally, officers can refer people to local hotels, restaurants, and other businesses.
 Lost and found – accepting reports of lost items and accepting found items from members of the public and, if a matching lost item is turned in, notifying the owner of the item to come pick up the item.
 Crime reports – taking police reports, typically for property crimes such as theft and burglary.
 Emergency services – dialing the emergency telephone number "110" in the case of police, fire, or medical emergency. Direct contact can be made with the kōban and assistance will be dispatched.

See also
Police box
Okoban

References

External links

 Kōban etymology on Metropolitan Police Department website 

1881 establishments in Japan
Koban, Police
Police stations in Japan